Intelligent Land Investments Group (ILI Group) is a land investment company based in Hamilton, Scotland. The ILI Group operate a number of land based investment funds primarily in the renewable energy and residential sectors.

The ILI Group secures the required rights over strategic land sites and represents these sites through the Local Authority planning process with aim to sell them at profit should they achieve the necessary planning permissions. They offer private investors the opportunity to invest in the fund at the initial stage and share in the profits once the land has been sold.

History
Intelligent Land Investments Ltd (ILI) was formed in 2004 and since inception has dealt exclusively with strategic residential projects.

In 2009, they started working in the renewable energy industry. They primarily dealt with single wind turbine instillations in line with the UK Feed-in Tariff securing planning consents for 96 developments throughout Scotland from 2011 to 2016. In addition they attained planning permission for two large scale solar sites and one hydro-run river project.

Intelligent Land Investments Group plc (ILI Group) was incorporated in 2017 to oversee all projects. Their main aim is to bring 1.1GW of energy storage to the UK electricity market via three new pump storage hydro installations in Scotland.

Intelligent Land Investments (Battery Storage) Ltd [ILI (Battery Storage)] was incorporated in 2017. This arm of the business expects to achieve planning permission for up to 30 medium scale industrial battery storage units distributed throughout Scotland.

In June 2020, ILI became the main shirt sponsor of Inverness Caledonian Thistle F.C. for the 2020–21 Season

See also

Investment management
Pump Storage Hydro
Renewable energy commercialization
Wind power in Scotland
Renewables Obligation
WindEurope
The Carbon Trust
Feed-in Tariff

References

External links
Intelligent Land Investments Group Official Website

Companies based in South Lanarkshire
Investment companies of the United Kingdom
British companies established in 2004